Terranova di Pollino is a town and comune in the province of Potenza, in the Basilicata region of Italy. The town is located in the Pollino National Park.

References

Cities and towns in Basilicata